Rhode Island v. Massachusetts, 37 U.S. (12 Pet.) 657 (1838), was a United States Supreme Court case in which the Court asserted its original jurisdiction over a suit in equity by one state against another over their shared border. The case involved a boundary dispute between Massachusetts and Rhode Island dating back to colonial times. Daniel Webster was involved in the case representing Massachusetts.

External links
 

United States Supreme Court cases
United States Supreme Court cases of the Taney Court
United States Supreme Court original jurisdiction cases
Property law in the United States
1838 in United States case law
Internal territorial disputes of the United States
Legal history of Massachusetts
Borders of Massachusetts
Legal history of Rhode Island
Borders of Rhode Island
1838 in Massachusetts
1838 in Rhode Island